Irina Amalie Andersen (born 15 October 1998) is a Danish badminton player. Born in Roskilde, Andersen trained at the Lillerød badminton club. She made her international debut in 2013, later entered the Badminton Europe Centre of Excellence (CoE) in May 2019. At the 2016 Finnish International tournament, she claimed two titles after won the women's singles and doubles events.

Achievements

European Junior Championships 
Girls' singles

BWF International Challenge/Series (4 titles, 3 runners-up) 
Women's singles

Women's doubles

Mixed doubles

  BWF International Challenge tournament
  BWF International Series tournament
  BWF Future Series tournament

References

External links 
 

1998 births
Living people
People from Roskilde
Danish female badminton players
Sportspeople from Region Zealand
21st-century Danish women